Luis Fishman Zonzinski (born 30 December 1947) is a Costa Rican politician. He was the President of the Legislative Assembly of Costa Rica from 1998 to 1999. Fishman Zonzinski was elected as the Second Vice President of Costa Rica alongside Lineth Saborío Chaverri from 2002–2006, but never formally  took office. In 2010, he was the Social Christian Unity Party's candidate for president in the general election.

References

1947 births
Living people
Presidents of the Legislative Assembly of Costa Rica
Costa Rican people of Polish-Jewish descent
Vice presidents of Costa Rica
Social Christian Unity Party politicians